Edward Patrick Francis Eagan (April 26, 1897 – June 14, 1967) was an American boxer and bobsledder who is notable as being the only person to win a gold medal at both the Summer and Winter Olympic Games in different disciplines. Eagan won his summer gold in boxing and his winter gold in four-man bobsled. Finally, Eagan is one of the few athletes who have competed in both the Summer and Winter Olympic games.

Early life

Eagan was born into a modest family in Denver, Colorado. He graduated from Longmont High School and attended college at Denver University for one year, during which time he won the western middleweight title. During World War I he was an artillery lieutenant and was the middleweight champion of the American Expeditionary Forces. After the war he attended Yale University. In 1919
he won the AAU's heavyweight title. After graduating from Yale in 1921, Eagan attended Harvard Law School and the University of Oxford. In 1923 he won Amateur Boxing Association heavyweight title.

Olympics

Summer Olympics
In 1920, he competed as a boxer at the 1920 Summer Olympics in Antwerp, and won the gold medal in the light-heavyweight division. He also competed at the 1924 Summer Olympics, but this time as a heavyweight. He failed to medal, having lost in the first round to Arthur Clifton (see Boxing at the 1924 Summer Olympics - Men's heavyweight).

Winter Olympics
Eagan returned to the Olympics eight years later, this time as a member of the bobsled crew of Billy Fiske, who steered to victory at the 1932 Winter Olympics in Lake Placid. Eagan became the first of six Olympians to medal in both the Winter and Summer Games, followed by Jacob Tullin Thams (Norway), Christa Luding-Rothenburger (East Germany), Clara Hughes (Canada), and Lauryn Williams (United States). Eddy Alvarez joined Eagan and Williams in 2020 as the only Americans to win medals in both the Winter and Summer Olympics. Eagan is one of two competitors to win gold in both Olympic seasons (the other being Gillis Grafström whose only summer gold was in figure skating).

Personal life

In 1927 Eagan married Margaret Colgate, who was a member of the family that founded Colgate-Palmolive. In 1932 he was admitted to the New York bar and began a career in private practice. He spent five years as an Assistant United States Attorney for the Southern District of New York before joining the United States Army Air Forces. During World War II, he served in the Air Transport Command and visited nearly every place where the Army had planes. He retired with the rank of lieutenant colonel and earned numerous decorations. After the war, Egan was appointed chairman of the New York State Athletic Commission. He resigned in 1951 to focus on his law practice.

Eddie Eagan set a world record for the fastest circumnavigation of the globe by scheduled airlines on December 13, 1948.  He traveled 20,559 miles stopping at 18 different stations and beat the previous record by 20 hours and 15 minutes.

He died at age 70 in New York City and was interred at Greenwood Union Cemetery.

See also
 Adventurers' Club of New York
 List of Olympians who won medals in the Summer and Winter Games

Notes

References

External links 

 
 

1897 births
1967 deaths
Boxers from Denver
American male bobsledders
American male boxers
United States Army personnel of World War II
Bobsledders at the 1932 Winter Olympics
Boxers at the 1920 Summer Olympics
Boxers at the 1924 Summer Olympics
Harvard Law School alumni
Medalists at the 1920 Summer Olympics
Medalists at the 1932 Winter Olympics
New York State Athletic Commissioners
Olympic boxers of the United States
Olympic gold medalists for the United States in bobsleigh
People from Rye, New York
United States Army colonels
Winners of the United States Championship for amateur boxers
Olympic gold medalists for the United States in boxing
Light-heavyweight boxers